The men's 100 metres at the 1950 European Athletics Championships was held in Brussels, Belgium, at Heysel Stadium on 23 and 24 August 1950.

Medalists

Results

Final
24 August
Wind: 0.7 m/s

Semi-finals
24 August

Semi-final 1
Wind: -0.2 m/s

Semi-final 2
Wind: 0.4 m/s

Heats
23 August

Heat 1
Wind: 0 m/s

Heat 2
Wind: -0.1 m/s

Heat 3
Wind: -0.1 m/s

Heat 4
Wind: -0.1 m/s

Heat 5
Wind: -1.3 m/s

Heat 6
Wind: -0.4 m/s

Participation
According to an unofficial count, 26 athletes from 16 countries participated in the event.

 (2)
 (1)
 (2)
 (1)
 (2)
 (2)
 (2)
 (1)
 (2)
 (1)
 (1)
 (2)
 (2)
 (2)
 (2)
 (1)

References

100 metres
100 metres at the European Athletics Championships